Luxembourg, also known as Luxembourg City ( or ; ;  or ), is the capital city of Luxembourg and the country's most populous commune. The city contains Luxembourg Castle, established by the Franks in the Early Middle Ages, around which a settlement developed.

, Luxembourg City has a population of 128,514 inhabitants, which is more than three times the population of the country's second most populous commune (Esch-sur-Alzette). The city's population consists of 160 nationalities. Foreigners represent 70% of the city's population, whilst Luxembourgers represent 30% of the population; the number of foreign-born residents in the city rises steadily each year.

In 2022, Luxembourg was ranked as having the highest per capita GDP in the world at $137,950(PPP), with the city having developed into a banking and administrative centre. In the 2019 Mercer worldwide survey of 231 cities, Luxembourg was placed first for personal safety, while it was ranked 18th for quality of living. 

Luxembourg is one of the de facto capitals of the European Union (alongside Brussels, Frankfurt and Strasbourg), as it is the seat of several institutions, agencies and bodies, including the Court of Justice of the European Union, the European Court of Auditors, the Secretariat of the European Parliament, the European Public Prosecutor's Office, the European Investment Bank, the European Investment Fund, the European Stability Mechanism, Eurostat, as well as other European Commission departments and services. The Council of the European Union meets in the city for three months annually.

History

In the Roman era, a fortified tower guarded the crossing of two Roman roads that met at the site of Luxembourg city. Through an exchange treaty with the abbey of Saint Maximin in Trier in 963, Siegfried I of the Ardennes, a close relative of King Louis II of France and Emperor Otto the Great, acquired the feudal lands of Luxembourg. Siegfried built his castle, named Lucilinburhuc ("small castle"), on the Bock Fiels ("rock"), mentioned for the first time in the aforementioned exchange treaty.

In 987, Archbishop Egbert of Trier consecrated five altars in the Church of the Redemption (today St. Michael's Church). At a Roman road intersection near the church, a marketplace appeared around which the city developed.

The city, because of its location and natural geography, has through history been a place of strategic military significance. The first fortifications were built as early as the 10th century. In about 1340, under the reign of John the Blind, new fortifications were built that stood until 1867.

In 1443, the Burgundians under Philip the Good conquered Luxembourg. Luxembourg became part of the Burgundian, and later Spanish and Austrian empires (See Spanish Netherlands and Spanish Road) and under those Habsburg administrations Luxembourg Castle was repeatedly strengthened so that by the 16th century, Luxembourg itself was one of the strongest fortifications in Europe. Subsequently, the Burgundians, the Spanish, the French, the Spanish again, the Austrians, the French again, and the Prussians conquered Luxembourg.

In the 17th century, the first casemates were built; initially, Spain built  of tunnels, starting in 1644. These were then enlarged under French rule by Marshal Vauban, and augmented again under Austrian rule in the 1730s and 1740s.

During the French Revolutionary Wars, the city was occupied by France twice: once, briefly, in 1792–93, and, later, after a seven-month siege. Luxembourg held out for so long under the French siege that French politician and military engineer Lazare Carnot called Luxembourg "the best fortress in the world, except Gibraltar", giving rise to the city's nickname: the 'Gibraltar of the North'.

Nonetheless, the Austrian garrison eventually surrendered, and as a consequence, Luxembourg was annexed by the French Republic, becoming part of the département of Forêts, with Luxembourg City as its préfecture. Under the 1815 Treaty of Paris, which ended the Napoleonic Wars, Luxembourg City was placed under Prussian military control as a part of the German Confederation, although sovereignty passed to the House of Orange-Nassau, in personal union with the United Kingdom of the Netherlands.

After the Luxembourg Crisis, the 1867 Treaty of London required Luxembourg to dismantle the fortifications in Luxembourg City. Furthermore, the Prussian garrison was to be withdrawn.

When, in 1890, Grand Duke William III died without any male heirs, the Grand Duchy passed out of Dutch hands, and into an independent line under Grand Duke Adolphe. Thus, Luxembourg, which had hitherto been independent in theory only, became a truly independent country, and Luxembourg City regained some of the importance that it had lost in 1867 by becoming the capital of a fully independent state.

Despite Luxembourg's best efforts to remain neutral in the First World War, it was occupied by Germany on 2 August 1914. On 30 August, Helmuth von Moltke moved his headquarters to Luxembourg City, closer to his armies in France in preparation for a swift victory. However, the victory never came, and Luxembourg would play host to the German high command for another four years. At the end of the occupation, Luxembourg City was the scene of an attempted communist revolution; on 9 November 1918, communists declared a socialist republic, but it lasted only a few hours.

In 1921, the city limits were greatly expanded. The communes of Eich, Hamm, Hollerich, and Rollingergrund were incorporated into Luxembourg City, making the city the largest commune in the country (a position that it would hold until 1978).

In 1940, Germany occupied Luxembourg again. The Nazis were not prepared to allow Luxembourgers self-government, and gradually integrated Luxembourg into the Third Reich by informally attaching the country administratively to a neighbouring German province. Under the occupation, the capital city's streets all received new, German names, which was announced on 4 October 1940. The Avenue de la Liberté for example, a major road leading to the railway station, was renamed "Adolf-Hitlerstraße". Luxembourg City was liberated on 10 September 1944. The city was under long-range bombardment by the German V-3 cannon in December 1944 and January 1945.

After the war, Luxembourg ended its neutrality, and became a founding member of several inter-governmental and supra-governmental institutions. In 1952, the city became the headquarters of the High Authority of the European Coal and Steel Community. In 1967, the High Authority was merged with the commissions of the other European institutions; although Luxembourg City was no longer the seat of the ECSC, it hosted some part-sessions of the European Parliament until 1981. Luxembourg remains the seat of the European Parliament's secretariat, as well as the Court of Justice of the European Union, the European Court of Auditors, and the European Investment Bank. Several departments of the European Commission are also based in Luxembourg.  The Council of the EU meets in the city for the months of April, June and October annually.

Geography

Topography

Luxembourg City lies on the southern part of the Luxembourg plateau, a large Early Jurassic sandstone formation that forms the heart of the Gutland, a low-lying and flat area that covers the southern two-thirds of the country.

The city centre occupies a picturesque site on a salient, perched high on precipitous cliffs that drop into the narrow valleys of the Alzette and Pétrusse rivers, whose confluence is in Luxembourg City. Although Luxembourg City is not particularly large, its layout is complex, as the city is set on several levels, straddling hills and dropping into the two gorges.

This makes the city the fourth-largest commune in Luxembourg, and by far the largest urban area. Luxembourg City is not particularly densely populated, at about 1,700 people per km2; large areas of Luxembourg City are maintained as parks, forested areas, or sites of important heritage (particularly the UNESCO sites), while there are also large tracts of farmland within the city limits.

Quarters of Luxembourg City

Luxembourg City is subdivided into twenty-four quarters, which cover the commune in its entirety. The quarters generally correspond to the major neighbourhoods and suburbs of Luxembourg City, although a few of the historic districts, such as Bonnevoie, are divided between two quarters.

Climate
Considering its latitude, Luxembourg City has an oceanic climate (Cfb), with moderate precipitation, cold to cool winters and warm summers. Moderate to heavy cloud cover is present for more than two-thirds of the year.

Population

Government

Local government

Under the Luxembourgian constitution, local government is centred on the city's communal council. Consisting of twenty-seven members (fixed since 1964), each elected every six years on the second Sunday of October and taking office on 1 January of the next year, the council is the largest of all communal councils in Luxembourg. The city is nowadays considered a stronghold of the Democratic Party (DP), which is the second-largest party nationally. The Democratic Party is the largest party on the council, with nine councillors.

The city's administration is headed by the mayor, who is the leader of the largest party on the communal council. After Xavier Bettel became Luxembourg's new prime minister on 4 December 2013, Lydie Polfer (DP) was sworn in as new mayor of Luxembourg on 17 December of the same year. Since the last elections the mayor leads the cabinet, the collège échevinal, in which the DP forms a coalition with CSV. Unlike other cities in Luxembourg, which are limited to four échevins at most, Luxembourg is given special dispensation to have six échevins on its collège échevinal.

National government
 
Luxembourg City is the seat for the Luxembourg Government. The Grand Ducal Family of Luxembourg lives at Berg Castle in Colmar-Berg.

For national elections to the Chamber of Deputies, the city is located in the Centre constituency.

European institutions
Luxembourg City is the seat of several institutions, agencies and bodies of the European Union, including the Court of Justice of the European Union, the European Commission, the secretariat of the European Parliament, the European Court of Auditors and the European Investment Bank. The majority of these institutions are located in the Kirchberg quarter, in the northeast of the city.

Culture

Despite the city's small size, it has several notable museums: the recently renovated National Museum of History and Art (MNHA), the Luxembourg City History Museum, the new Grand Duke Jean Museum of Modern Art (Mudam) and National Museum of Natural History (NMHN). The city of Luxembourg itself is on the UNESCO World Heritage List, on account of the historical importance of its fortifications. In addition to its two main theatres, the Grand Théâtre de Luxembourg and the Théâtre des Capucins, there is a new concert hall, the Philharmonie, as well as a conservatory with a large auditorium. Art galleries include the Villa Vauban, the Casino Luxembourg and Am Tunnel.

Luxembourg was the first city to be named European Capital of Culture twice. The first time was in 1995. In 2007, along with the Romanian city of Sibiu, the European Capital of Culture was to be a cross-border area consisting of the Grand Duchy of Luxembourg, the Rheinland-Pfalz and Saarland in Germany, the Walloon Region and the German-speaking part of Belgium, and the Lorraine area in France. The event was an attempt to promote mobility and the exchange of ideas, crossing borders in all areas, physical, psychological, artistic and emotional.

Luxembourg City is also famed for its wide selection of restaurants and cuisines, including four Michelin starred establishments.

Sport
The ING Europe Marathon has been contested annually in the capital since June 2006. It attracted 11,000 runners and over 100,000 spectators during the 2014 edition.

The Luxembourg Open is a tennis tournament held since 1991 in the capital. The tournament runs from 13 to 21 October. BGL BNP Paribas, one of the more famous sponsors in the world of tennis, was the contracted title sponsor of the tournament until 2014.

The Stade de Luxembourg, situated in Gasperich, southern Luxembourg City, is the country's national stadium and largest sports venue in the country with a capacity of 9,386 for sporting events, including football and rugby union, and 15,000 for concerts. The largest indoor venue in the country is d'Coque, Kirchberg, north-eastern Luxembourg City, which has a capacity of 8,300. The arena is used for basketball, handball, gymnastics, and volleyball, including the final of the 2007 Women's European Volleyball Championship. D'Coque also includes an Olympic-size swimming pool.

The two football clubs of the city of Luxembourg; Racing FC Union Luxembourg and FC RM Hamm Benfica, play in the country's highest league, the Luxembourg National Division. The Stade de Luxembourg hosts the Luxembourg national football team.

Places of interest

Places of interest include the Gothic Revival Cathedral of Notre Dame, the fortifications, Am Tunnel (an art gallery underground), the Grand Ducal Palace, the Gëlle Fra war memorial, the casemates, the Neumünster Abbey, the Place d'Armes, the Adolphe Bridge and the city hall. The city is home to the RTL Group.

The Second World War Luxembourg American Cemetery and Memorial is located within the city limits of Luxembourg at Hamm. This cemetery is the final resting place of 5,076 American military dead, including General George S. Patton. There is also a memorial to 371 Americans whose remains were never recovered or identified.

Transport

Highways
Luxembourg is situated in the heart of Europe in the Gold Triangle between Frankfurt, Paris, and Amsterdam. It is therefore connected to several motorways and international routes.

 A1 (E44): to Grevenmacher and Trier (Germany).
 A3 (E25): to Dudelange and Thionville (France).
 A4: to Esch-sur-Alzette and to A13 to Pétange, Athus (Belgium) and Longwy (France)
 A6 (E25 / E411): to Arlon and Brussels.
 A7 (E421): to Mersch and Ettelbruck.

Public transport
Public transport in Luxembourg City has been free since 2020, including rail, bus and tram.

Rail
Luxembourg City is served by five rail stations operated by the state rail company, the Société Nationale des Chemins de Fer Luxembourgeois (CFL), including the principal station and terminus of all rail lines in the Grand Duchy, Luxembourg station. Stations in Luxembourg City are served by domestic rail services operated by CFL, as well as international rail services, operated by CFL,  and German, Belgian, and French service providers. Additionally, Luxembourg station is connected to the French LGV Est network, providing high-speed services on to Paris and Strasbourg. Services to Basel and Zürich in Switzerland are available via two daily scheduled international trains.

Bus
Luxembourg City has a network of 31 bus routes, operated by the municipal transport authority, Autobus de la Ville de Luxembourg (AVL), partly subcontracted to private bus companies. There is also a free bus service linking the Glacis to Luxembourg station, the "Joker Line" for seniors, and a "City night network". A "Park & Ride"  scheme is operated by the city with five carparks connected to the bus network. In addition to AVL buses, CFL and RGTR operate regional buses to other locales in Luxembourg and nearby cities in Germany and France.

Tram
Between 1875 and 1964, the city was covered by an extensive tram network. In December 2017, trams were reintoduced to the capital, with the phased opening of a new line, which currently runs between Kirchberg and Bonnevoie, via the city centre. Upon completion in 2024, the line will extend to Luxembourg Airport and the national stadium. Future lines to extend the network are currently in the planning stages.

Air

Luxembourg City is served by the only international airport in the country: Luxembourg Airport (codes: IATA: LUX, ICAO: ELLX). Accessibility to the airport, situated in the commune of Sandweiler,  from the city centre, is provided via the municipal bus network, with a tram connection due to be completed by early 2024. The airport is the principal hub for Luxembourg's flag carrier, Luxair, and one of the world's largest cargo airlines, Cargolux.

International relations
Luxembourg is a member of the QuattroPole union of cities, along with Trier, Saarbrücken, and Metz (neighbouring countries: Germany and France).

Twin towns – Sister cities

Luxembourg is twinned with:

 Metz, France
 Tambov Oblast, Russia
 Prague, Czech Republic

Image gallery

See also
List of mayors of Luxembourg City
Limes Luxemburgensis
Cessange
Eurovision Song Contest 1962, held at the Villa Louvigny
Eurovision Song Contest 1966, held at the Villa Louvigny
Eurovision Song Contest 1973, held at the Nouveau Théâtre Municipal 
Eurovision Song Contest 1984, held in the Nouveau Théâtre Municipal

Notes

References

Bibliography

Further reading

External links
Commune of Luxembourg official website
Luxembourg City Tourism
Museum of the city of Luxembourg website
HoloGuides – photos, events and news
Luxembourg (city) Photo Gallery
A short break in Luxembourg (city)
Events, things to do and practical stuff in Luxembourg

 
Capitals in Europe
Cities in Luxembourg
Communes in Luxembourg (canton)
Towns in Luxembourg
World Heritage Sites in Luxembourg
Vauban fortifications